Yuriy Zorin (born September 4, 1947) is a former Russian track and field athlete who participated in world athletics representing the Soviet Union in the late 1960s and 1970s. He specialized in the 400 metres hurdles with an eight place at the 1972 Summer Olympics and the 400 metres, winning a bronze medal in Vienna at the 1970 European Indoor Championships in Athletics. He also won a gold medal in the 4 × 200 m relay with fellow Russian athlete Aleksandr Bratchikov, among others.

External links 
 Profile at Sports-Reference.com

References

Russian male hurdlers
Soviet male hurdlers
Soviet male sprinters
1947 births
Living people
European Athletics Championships medalists
Athletes (track and field) at the 1972 Summer Olympics
Olympic athletes of the Soviet Union
Universiade silver medalists for the Soviet Union
Universiade medalists in athletics (track and field)
Medalists at the 1970 Summer Universiade